Weight-shift control as a means of aircraft flight control is widely used in hang gliders, powered hang gliders, and ultralight trikes. Control is usually by the pilot using their weight against a triangular control bar that is rigidly attached to the wing structure. The wing is mounted on a pivot above the trike carriage or hang glider harness allowing the weight-shift forces to produce changes in pitch and bank.

References

See also 
Ultralight aircraft

Aircraft controls
Applications of control engineering
Aircraft categories